Femke Hiemstra (born 1974 in Zaandam) is a Dutch painter.

Work
Hiemstra started as a freelance illustrator for 10 years until her paintings became too elaborate for commissions and she transitioned into working primarily in fine art. Her work is usually categorized as pop surrealist or American lowbrow art, but she has said that the most accurate label for her work is "Neo-Fabulism" due to the anthropomorphic (see Anthropomorphism), and narrative-based subject matter. Despite her underground style, Hiemstra has been met with a dedicated fan base; most of her shows selling out within minutes of their announcement. Her mixed media works are made with delicate layers of acrylic paint and color pencil on the surfaces of old books or other bric-a-brac objects. The themes are often mixtures of animals and comic characters, dark surreal settings and stylized typography.

 Carnival, or the Story of a Sad Hungry Bunny. Antwerp, Bries, 2005 
 Rock Candy. With an overview of her work, Fantagraphics Books, 2009, .

Education

1990-1994: School of Graphic Arts, Amsterdam
1994-1997: Art Academy, Utrecht

References

External links
 Femke Hiemstra's website

1974 births
Living people
21st-century Dutch women artists
Dutch painters
Dutch illustrators
Dutch women illustrators
Dutch surrealist artists
Women surrealist artists
Dutch women painters
People from Zaanstad